The 1950 All-Ireland Senior Football Championship was the 64th staging of Ireland's premier Gaelic football knock-out competition.

In the Leinster final Louth ended Meath's spell as All Ireland champions. 

Mayo won their second All-Ireland.

Results

Connacht Senior Football Championship

Leinster Senior Football Championship

Munster Senior Football Championship

Ulster Senior Football Championship

All-Ireland Senior Football Championship

Championship statistics

Miscellaneous

 The Connacht final between Mayo and Roscommon took place at the new Tuam Stadium, in Tuam.
 Armagh end a 47-year wait by winning their first Ulster title since 1903.
 The All Ireland semi-final between Mayo and Armagh was their first championship meeting.
 Mayo end a 14-year period by winning their second All Ireland title.

References

All-Ireland Senior Football Championship